George Gordon Coulton  (15 October 1858 – 4 March 1947) was a British historian, known for numerous works on medieval history. He was known also as a keen controversialist.

Coulton was born in King's Lynn and educated at King's Lynn Grammar School, Felsted School, and St Catharine's College, Cambridge.

He taught for a short period, and was ordained in 1883. He did not however pursue a life in the Church of England, due to the absence of vocation, and took further teaching jobs, beginning as an independent scholar to study the history of the Middle Ages. A fierce anti-Catholic, he was often, especially during the 1930s, embroiled in embittered journalistic controversy with Hilaire Belloc, who detested him.

In 1911 Coulton found a lecturing position at the University of Cambridge. He became a Fellow of St John's College, Cambridge in 1919, and a Fellow of the British Academy in 1929.

Works
 Father Rhine (1898) travel writing
  "The Monastic Legend: A Criticism of Abbot Gasquet's Henry VIII and the English Monasteries" (1905), article, Medieval Studies, issue 1.
 Friar's Lantern (1906)
 Pearl. A Fourteenth-Century Poem (1906) translator
 From Saint Francis to Dante. Translations from the Chronicle of the Franciscan Salimbene (1221 - 1288) (1907)
 Chaucer and his England (1908) - Reprinted in 1993 by Bracken Books.
 A Medieval Garner (1910) 
 Life in the Middle Ages (1910; revised 1928 in four volumes)
 French Monasticism in 1503 (1915)
 The Main Illusions of Pacificism: a Criticism of Mr. Norman Angell and of the Union of Democratic Control (1916)
 The Plain man's religion in the Middle Ages (1916) pamphlet
 The Case for Compulsory Military Service (1917)
 Social Life in Britain from the Conquest to the Reformation (1918) 
 Christ, St Francis and To-Day (1919) 
 The Roman Catholic Church and the Bible. Some Historical Notes (1921) booklet
 Monasticism: Its Cause and Effects. Sketch of the Social and Intellectual Part Played By World History By the Monastic Institution
 Infant Perdition in the Middle Ages (1922)
 Papal Infallibility (1922)
 A Victorian Schoolmaster: Henry Hart of Sedbergh (1923)
 The Death Penalty for Heresy from 1164 to 1921 AD (1924)
 Roman Catholic Truth: An Open Discussion between G. G. Coulton and L. J. Walker (1924)
 The Medieval Village (1925) Medieval Village, Manor & Monastery
 Art and the Reformation (1928) also as Medieval Faith And Symbolism and Fate of Medieval Art in the Renaissance & Reformation
 Miracle of the Blessed Virgin Mary (1928) editor
 The Inquisition (1929)
 Modern Faith (1929)
 The Black Death (1929)
 Crusades, Commerce and Adventure (1930)
 The Works of Liudprand of Cremona (1930) edited with Eileen Power
 Malta - And Beyond (1930) pamphlet
 Froissart and His Chronicles: The Chronicler of European Chivalry (1930)
 The Medieval Scene (1930)
 Ten Medieval Studies, with Four Appendices (1930)
 Romanism And Truth (1930, two volumes)
 In Defence of the Reformation (1931) 
 Some Problems in Medieval Historiography (1932) Raleigh Lecture
 Two saints: St. Bernard & St. Francis (1932)
 Scottish Abbeys and Social Life
 The Meaning of Medieval Moneys (1934)
 Commentary on the Rule of St Augustine By Robertus Richardinus (1935) editor
 H. W. Fowler (1935)
 The Faith of St. Thomas More (1935)
 Sectarian History: A Fresh Development (1937) pamphlet
 The Scandal of Cardinal Gasquet (1937) pamphlet
 Inquisition and Liberty (1938) 
 Medieval Panorama (1938, 2 volumes)
 Studies in Medieval Thought (1940)
 Europe's Apprenticeship - a Survey of Medieval Latin with Examples (1940)
 Fourscore Years: an Autobiography (1943), winner of the James Tait Black Memorial Prize
 Is The Catholic Church Anti-Social? (1946) with Arnold Lunn
 Stained Glass of the 12th and 13th Centuries from French Cathedrals (1951) with Marcel Aubert
 Five Centuries of Religion (1927-1950) in four volumes: I St. Bernard, his predecessors and successors, 1000-1200 AD, II The friars and the dead weight of tradition, 1200-1400 AD, III Getting & spending, IV The last days of medieval monachism

References

Sources
 Campion, Sarah (1948). Father: a Portrait of G.G. Coulton at Home. London: Michael Joseph. LCCN 49000255

External links

 
 
 
 Guide to the George Gordon Coulton Papers 1875-1941 at the University of Chicago Special Collections Research Center
 Papers/biography

1858 births
1947 deaths
Alumni of St Catharine's College, Cambridge
British medievalists
Corresponding Fellows of the Medieval Academy of America
20th-century English historians
Fellows of St John's College, Cambridge
Fellows of the British Academy
James Tait Black Memorial Prize recipients
People educated at Felsted School
People from King's Lynn